This article presents the discography of TRU consists of four major label studio albums, two independent studio albums, one compilation and three singles.

Albums

Studio albums

Compilation albums

Singles

References

Hip hop discographies
Discographies of American artists